Mindy Newell (born October 24, 1953) is an American comic book writer and editor, best known for her work with DC Comics.

Early life 
Born in Brooklyn, New York, Newell graduated from high school in 1971. She then attended the Beth Israel Deaconess Medical Center to study nursing. Following her nursing schooling, Newell enrolled at Quinnipiac University and studied biology while working as a nurse.

Biography
A longtime fan of comics, particularly of Marvel's Spider-Man, Mindy Newell sent submissions to DC Comics in 1983 at a time when the company was actively looking for new talent. Her first professional work was her creation of the character Jenesis, which appeared in three issues of New Talent Showcase. Editor Karen Berger called her in for an interview four days after DC received her submission.

Hired by editors Dick Giordano and Karen Berger, Newell wrote fill-in issues for Legion of Super-Heroes and Action Comics. While working as part of the new talent program, Newell became the writer of Wonder Woman. She was the first credited woman to write the Wonder Woman series in an ongoing capacity but was limited in what she could write due to editorial mandates. In 1986, Newell and artist Gray Morrow collaborated on a Lois Lane limited series which dealt with the subject of missing children. In addition, Newell wrote Wonder Woman and Her Sister's Keeper, a seminal Catwoman limited series. Newell also briefly worked on First Comics's American Flagg and Eclipse Comics's The New Wave.

Newell has always maintained a career as a nurse while writing comics, and has since returned to that occupation full-time.

Personal life 
Newell is a full-time nurse and mother, while still contributing to comics and other projects. Her former husband,  John Higgins, is a British comic book writer, illustrator, and letterer.

Bibliography

Writer

Angry Isis Press
Choices: A Pro-Choice Benefit Comic Anthology for the National Organization for Women #1 (1990)

DC Comics
 
Action Comics (Superman) #566 (1985), (Catwoman) #611–614 (1988)
Amethyst vol. 2 #12, 15–16, Special #1 (1985–1986)
Amethyst vol. 3 #1–4 (mini-series, 1987–1988)
Catwoman #1–4 (mini-series, 1989)
Green Lantern Corps Annual #2 (1986)
Heroes Against Hunger #1 (two pages only, 1986)
Legionnaires 3 #1–4 (with co-author Keith Giffen, pencils by Ernie Colón and inks by Karl Kesel, mini-series, 1986)
Lois Lane #1–2 (art by Gray Morrow, miniseries) (1986)
New Talent Showcase #5, 7–11, 13 (1984)
Tales of the Legion of Super-Heroes #315–317, 320–325 (1984–1985)
V #7 (1985)
Wonder Woman #326–328 (1985)
Wonder Woman vol. 2 #36–46, 49 (1989–1990)

Eclipse Comics
Miracleman #8 (The New Wave preview) (1986)
The New Wave #1–13 (1986–1987)
The New Wave vs. the Volunteers #1–2 (1987)
Tales of Terror #3 (1985)

First Comics
American Flagg! #46–49 (scripting over Howard Chaykin's plot, 1987)
American Flagg! vol. 2 #1 (scripting over Howard Chaykin's plot, 1988)

IPC Magazines 
2000 AD #1412–1419, with co-author and artist John Higgins (2004)

Last Gasp
Strip AIDS U.S.A. #1 (1988)

Marvel Comics
 
Daredevil Annual #10 (1994)
Daredevil vs. Vapora #1 (1993)
Marvel Comics Presents #135 (Black Widow) (1993)
Power Pack Holiday Special #1 (1992)
Thunderstrike #17 (1995)
2099 Special: The World of Doom #1 (1995)

Editor

Marvel Comics
Car Warriors #3–4 (Epic, 1991)
Deathlok #25–27 (1993)
The Marvel X-Men Collection #1–3 (1994)

References

External links 
Mindy Newell at ComicMix

Mindy Newell at Mike's Amazing World of Comics
Mindy Newell at the Unofficial Handbook of Marvel Comics Creators

1953 births
American comics writers
American nurses
American women nurses
Comic book editors
DC Comics people
Female comics writers
Jewish American writers
Living people
Marvel Comics writers
Quinnipiac University alumni